Thomas Roth (born 21 November 1951, in Heilbronn) is a German news anchor presenter and television presenter.

Life 
He grow up in Heilbronn and attended the local Justinus-Kerner-Gymnasium. He then studied English Literature and German in Heidelberg. In the early 1980s Roth graduated as volunteer at the South German Radio and presented on the radio program SDR 3 the youth program  Point . From 1988 to 1991 Thomas Roth was ARD – Correspondent and studio manager in Johannesburg, then he worked in the ARD studio in Moscow. In 1995 he was the radio director of the WDR, before returning in 1998 for four years as a studio manager to Moscow. On 1 May 2002 Thomas Roth took over the post as host and chief editor of the ARD studio in Berlin. From 1 April 2007, he was again head of ARD Studio Moscow. From December 2008 until the summer of 2013 he was head of ARD studio in New York City.

From 5 August 2013, Thomas Roth was the host of  Tagesthemen  succeeding Tom Buhrow. In April 2016 it was announced that he will leave the show and retire. His successor was Ingo Zamperoni.

Other activities
 Action Reconciliation Service for Peace (ASF), Member of the Board of Trustees

Thomas Roth is a member of the organization Reporters Without Borders and held in the Berlin Academy of Arts on 25 September 2014, a speech on the 20th anniversary of the founding of the German section of the organization.

Work by Roth 
 Südafrika. Die letzte Chance. Stuttgart, Vienna: Edition Erdmann by Thienemanns, 1991. .
 Russisches Tagebuch. Eine Reise von den Tschuktschen bis zum Roten Platz. Munich: List, 1995. .
 Russland. Das wahre Gesicht einer Weltmacht. Munich: Piper, 2008. .

Awards 
 1995: Hanns Joachim Friedrichs Award
 1996: Friedrich-Joseph-Haass Award
 2009: Schweizerisch-Russischer Journalistenpreis
 2009: Liberty Award

External links 

 
 Interview with Thomas Roth at Planet-Interview
 Jens Berger:  (Analysis of an interview, led by Thomas Roth as head of ARD-Studio with Wladimir Putin) – Spiegelfechter, 31. August 2008

References 

German television reporters and correspondents
German male journalists
German broadcast news analysts
20th-century German journalists
21st-century German journalists
1951 births
Living people
People from Heilbronn
German male writers
German radio presenters
ARD (broadcaster) people
German television news anchors